Skall is a surname. Notable people with the surname include:

Ben Skall (1919–1993), American politician
William V. Skall (1897–1976), American cinematographer